Heterachthes w-notatum is a species of beetle in the family Cerambycidae. It was described by Linsley in 1935. It is found in Mexico.  Under Article 31.2.1 of the International Code of Zoological Nomenclature, the species name must be spelled w-notatum, despite being spelled w-notata by the original author, as letters of the alphabet are neuter in gender.

References

Heterachthes
Beetles described in 1935